Markivka is an urban-type settlement in the Starobilsk Raion of Luhansk Oblast in the east of Ukraine with the population about . Prior to 2020, it was the administrative center of the former Markivka Raion.

References 

Urban-type settlements in Starobilsk Raion
Starobilsk Raion
Starobelsky Uyezd